(born 25 May 1927) was a Japanese Nordic skier who competed in the early 1950s. At the 1952 Winter Olympics in Oslo, he finished 14th in the Nordic combined event, 34th in the ski jumping individual large hill event, and tied for 61st in the 18 km cross-country skiing event. He was born in Otaru.

External links
Olympic 18 km cross country skiing results: 1948–52
Olympic nordic combined results: 1948–64
Olympic ski jumping results: 1948–60
 

1927 births
Possibly living people
Cross-country skiers at the 1952 Winter Olympics
Nordic combined skiers at the 1952 Winter Olympics
Ski jumpers at the 1952 Winter Olympics
Japanese male cross-country skiers
Japanese male Nordic combined skiers
Japanese male ski jumpers
Olympic ski jumpers of Japan
Olympic cross-country skiers of Japan
Olympic Nordic combined skiers of Japan